Le Saveur is a 1971 French film directed by Michel Mardore, adapted from his own novel, and starring Horst Buchholz and Muriel Catala. Set in occupied France in 1943 Buchholz plays a supposed wounded English airman, Claude, and Catala plays the girl Nannette who falls for him. The supposed airman is soon revealed to be a cruel Nazi officer.

Production
Michel Mardore said he asked Muriel Catalá to shave her pubes to accentuate her childlike appearance. "This should have sold the film in Japan, since the Japanese abhor pubic hair and only accept the female nude when the woman is 
shaved..."

References

1971 films
French war drama films
French World War II films
1970s French films